August "Gustl" Friedrich Kubizek (3 August 1888 – 23 October 1956) was an Austrian musical conductor and writer best known for being a close friend of Adolf Hitler, when both were in their late teens. He later wrote about their friendship in his book The Young Hitler I Knew (1955).

Early life

August was born in Linz, Austria, the only surviving child to parents of Czech and Sudeten-German origin. He was baptized Catholic at the St. Matthias Church where his parents had married the previous year. His father Michael Kubíček (also born in Linz) was an upholsterer while his mother Maria Panholzer-Bláhová was born illegitimate in Rosee was 14. His sisters Maria, Therese and Karoline died in early childhood. Kubizek later wrote that this was a striking parallel between his own life and that of Adolf Hitler, whose mother had lost four children prematurely.  As the surviving sons of grief-stricken mothers, Kubizek and Hitler could not help but feel they had been spared or "chosen" by fate.

Kubizek and Hitler first met while competing for standing room in the Landestheater in Linz. Because of their shared passion for the operas of Richard Wagner, they quickly became close friends and later roommates in Vienna while both sought admission into college.  The two shared a small room in Stumpergasse 29/2/2 door 17 in the sixth district of Vienna from 22 February to early July 1908.

As the only son of a self-employed upholsterer, Kubizek was expected to someday take over his father's business, but he secretly harboured dreams of becoming a conductor. With Hitler's encouragement, he devoted more and more of his time to this passion, completing all of the musical training available to him in Linz.  However, to achieve his goal of being an orchestral conductor, he would require higher education in music which was offered only in Vienna. It was an 18-year-old Hitler who persuaded Kubizek's father to let his son go to the metropolis to attend the conservatory. As Kubizek wrote, this was something that changed the course of his life for good.

He was immediately accepted into the Vienna Conservatory where he quickly made a name for himself. Hitler, however, was twice denied entrance into Vienna's art academy: a fact which he kept hidden from his friend for some time. In 1908, Hitler abruptly broke off the friendship and drifted into homelessness. Kubizek completed his studies in 1912 and was hired as conductor of the orchestra in Marburg on the Drau, Austria (Maribor, in Slovenia, after 1918). He was later offered a position at the Stadttheater in Klagenfurt, but this job and his musical career were cut short by the beginning of World War I.  Before leaving for the front, he married Anna Funke (7 October 1887 – 4 October 1976), a violinist from Vienna with whom he had three sons: Augustin, Karl Maria and Rudolf.

From August 1914 until November 1918, Kubizek served as a reservist in Regiment 2 of the Austro-Hungarian Infantry. In the Carpathian winter campaign of 1915, he was wounded at Eperjes in Hungary (now Prešov in Slovakia) and later evacuated to Budapest in an ambulance train. After months of convalescence, he returned to the front and was attached to a mechanised corps in Vienna. After the war, Kubizek accepted a position as an official in the municipal council of Eferding, Upper Austria and music became his hobby.

Later contact with Hitler
After seeing Hitler on the front page of the Münchner Illustrierte (circa 1920), Kubizek followed his friend's career with some interest, although he did not attempt to contact him until 1933 when he wrote to congratulate him on having become Chancellor of Germany. On 4 August of that year, Kubizek received an unexpected reply from Hitler, who wrote to his old friend "Gustl" saying, "I should be very glad... to revive once more with you those memories of the best years of my life."  Thirty years after Hitler had broken off contact with Kubizek, the two friends were reunited on 9 April 1938 during one of Hitler's visits to Linz. The two spoke for over an hour at the Hotel Weinzinger and Hitler offered Kubizek the conductorship of an orchestra, which Kubizek politely refused. Upon learning of his friend's three sons, Hitler insisted on financing their educations at the Anton Bruckner Conservatory in Linz. Hitler later invited Kubizek to attend the Bayreuth festival as his guest in 1939 and again in 1940.

In 1938, Kubizek was hired by the Nazi Party to write two short propaganda booklets called Reminiscences about his youth with Hitler. In one episode, Kubizek said that Hitler had a great love for a girl named "Stefanie" and wrote her many love poems but never sent them. Hitler's biographer John Toland said that when Stefanie learned she had been an early subject of Hitler's affection, she was stunned.

Kubizek saw Hitler for the last time on 23 July 1940; although as late as 1944, Hitler sent Kubizek's mother a food basket for her 80th birthday. Hitler told Kubizek: "This war will set us back many years in our building programme. It is a tragedy. I did not become Chancellor of the Greater German Reich to fight wars." 

When the tide began to turn against Hitler, Kubizek, who had avoided politics all his life, became a member of the Nazi Party in 1942 as a gesture of loyalty to his friend.

Later life, imprisonment and memoirs

In December 1945, Kubizek gathered the collection of keepsakes given to him by Hitler during their youth and concealed them carefully in the basement of his house in Eferding.  He was arrested by American forces shortly afterwards and held at Glasenbach, where he was imprisoned and interrogated by the U.S. Army Criminal Investigation Command. His home was searched, but the Hitler correspondence and drawings were not found. He was released on 8 April 1947.

In 1951, Kubizek, who had rejected other post-war offers for his memoirs, agreed to publish Adolf Hitler, mein Jugendfreund ("Adolf Hitler, My Childhood Friend") through the Leopold Stocker Verlag.  The original manuscript, written in 1943 at the behest of Martin Bormann (Kubizek says in his memoirs that Martin Bormann asked him to do so), had been only 150 pages long.  However, after communications answering questions from the Hitler biographer Franz Jetzinger, his  new extended version had 352 pages and included several pictures, many of which showed postcards and sketches given to Kubizek by Hitler when young, between the years 1906 and 1908.  The book is divided into three parts and consists of a prologue, 24 chapters and an epilogue.

It caused a stir when it was released in 1953 and was later translated into several languages. In the epilogue, Kubizek wrote, "Even though I, a fundamentally unpolitical individual, had always kept aloof from the political events of the period which ended forever in 1945, nevertheless no power on earth could compel me to deny my friendship with Adolf Hitler."

Kubizek's second wife and widow, Pauline (1906–2001), was credited with having provided the Stocker Verlag with additional photographs for the book's fourth edition in 1975.

He died on 23 October 1956, aged 68, in Linz and is buried in Eferding, Upper Austria.

In popular culture
Kubizek is portrayed by Rupert Grint in "Adolf Hitler: The Artist", a 2017 episode of the British television series Urban Myths, in which Hitler calls him "Gustl".

Works
 Kubizek, A. (1955). The Young Hitler I Knew: The Memoirs of Hitler's Childhood Friend 

See also
Reinhold Hanisch
Josef Greiner

References

External links 
 The Young Hitler I Knew on Archive.org

1888 births
1956 deaths
20th-century Austrian conductors (music)
20th-century Austrian male musicians
Austrian male writers
Austrian memoirists
Austrian Nazis
Austrian Roman Catholics
Austrian people of Czech descent
Austrian people of Sudeten-German descent
Austro-Hungarian military personnel of World War I
Male conductors (music)
Musicians from Linz
Views on Adolf Hitler
Austrian prisoners of war
Nazi Party members